The Watkins House is a historic house at 1208 East Race Street in Searcy, Arkansas.  It is a two-story wood-frame structure, with a side gambrel roof and original stucco exterior.  A single-story ell extends to the left, and a similarly sized carport extends to the right.  The gambrel nature of the roof is somewhat obscured by the large shed-roof dormer that extends across most of the front. Built 1919–20, it is one of a small number of Colonial Revival houses in the community.

The house was listed on the National Register of Historic Places in 1991.

See also
National Register of Historic Places listings in White County, Arkansas

References

Houses on the National Register of Historic Places in Arkansas
Colonial Revival architecture in Arkansas
Houses completed in 1919
Houses in Searcy, Arkansas
National Register of Historic Places in Searcy, Arkansas
1919 establishments in Arkansas